Chinangin is a locality in Victoria, Australia, located approximately 42 km from Swan Hill.

References

Towns in Victoria (Australia)
Rural City of Swan Hill